Thomas Hale may refer to:

 Thomas Hale (settler) (1610–1679), founding settler of Hartford and Norwalk, Connecticut
 Thomas Hale (agriculturist) (died 1759), British writer on agriculture
 Thomas Hale (cricketer) (1829–1899), English cricketer
 Thomas Egerton Hale (1832–1909), English surgeon major and recipient of the Victoria Cross
 Thomas Hale Jr. (born 1937), American physician and author

See also 
 Thomas Hales (disambiguation)